Group B of the 2019 AFC Asian Cup took place from 6 to 15 January 2019. The group consisted of defending champions Australia, Syria, Palestine, and Jordan. The top two teams, Jordan and Australia, advanced to the round of 16.

Teams

Notes

Standings

In the round of 16:
 The winners of Group B, Jordan, advanced to play the third-placed team of Group D, Vietnam.
 The runners-up of Group B, Australia, advanced to play the runners-up of Group F, Uzbekistan.

Matches
All times listed are GST (UTC+4).

Australia vs Jordan
 
With 10 minutes on the clock, Musa Al-Taamari turned in the area, only to shoot across the face of the goal. Robbie Kruse’s through ball found Awer Mabil, whose first-time shot was kept out by Amer Shafi. At 26 minutes, Baha' Abdel-Rahman’s corner found Anas Bani Yaseen who powered his header beyond Mathew Ryan. Minutes later Jordan almost doubled their lead after Trent Sainsbury’s foul on Al-Taamari provided Abdel-Rahman the opportunity to go for goal from the edge of the area, only for Ryan to tip the free-kick onto the crossbar. Australia were denied a penalty for Feras Shelbaieh's apparent handball shortly before the break. Early in the second half, Mabil drove a low ball across the face of goal that Shafi pushed to the feet of one of his own defenders, while Tom Rogic’s dipping shot from range was also beaten away by the goalkeeper. At the other end, Yaseen Al-Bakhit’s long range drive was just off target moments after beating two defenders and seeing the ball out for a corner. Twelve minutes from time, Mabil saw his low drive come back off the base of Shafi’s left upright while substitute Jackson Irvine headed wide three minutes later. Australia continued to push and Shafi was forced into action in the final seconds of the game as Jordan recorded a historic result.

Syria vs Palestine
 
Omar Al Somah’s run down the left caught Palestine off guard and his cross found Omar Kharbin in the area who fired his effort wide. Syria almost took the lead after seven minutes, when Palestine custodian Rami Hamadeh lost the ball in the area only for Kharbin to see his close-range effort cleared off the line by Abdullah Jaber. Syria continued to pile the pressure on Palestine as Hamadeh was called into action in the 29th minute when he produced an acrobatic save to deny Kharbin's header. Syria then suffered a blow in the 39th minute when Osama Omari was stretchered off the pitch after picking up an injury and replaced by Youssef Kalfa. With a minute left in the half, Syria were given another opportunity but Al Somah couldn’t convert his free-kick as the score remained 0–0 at half-time. Palestine went down to 10 men after Mohammed Saleh picked up his second yellow card in the 68th minute. However, Syria failed to capitalise on their one-man advantage, and both the teams settled for a share of the points.

Jordan vs Syria
The opener came in the 26th minute when Yaseen Al-Bakhit cut the ball back from the left to Yousef Al-Rawashdeh and his low driven centre was steered home at pace by Musa Al-Taamari. Three minutes later Jordan came close to score their second as Al-Bakhit found Al-Taamari, only for his effort to bounce off the turf before clearing the crossbar. The second goal came two minutes before the interval, Baha' Abdel-Rahman’s short corner to Al-Taamari was whipped into the area and Tareq Khattab held off the Syrian defence to head home at the near post. Omar Kharbin headed just over the bar five minutes after the restart before shooting straight at Amer Shafi six minutes later. Kharbin was involved again in the 71st minute as the Jordanian defence made an error to gift him the ball 25 yards from goal, but this time Shafi was on hand to save, doing just enough to divert his shot wide of the left post. Jordan came close to score late as both Saeed Murjan and Ahmad Ersan narrowly missed. The Syrian coach Bernd Stange was sacked after this match, and replaced with former manager Fajr Ibrahim.

Palestine vs Australia
Jamie Maclaren headed in from Tom Rogic's cross to score his first international goal and give the holders a 1–0 lead in the 18th minute. Two minutes later, Australia doubled their lead when Awer Mabil found his way in behind the defence to side-foot home an angled pass from Chris Ikonomidis. Mabil was teed up by Maclaren in the dying moments of the first half, only for the winger to blaze his effort high and wide from close range. An attempted 54th-minute cross from Rhyan Grant caught the woodwork after a heavy deflection off Abdullah Jaber, while Palestine's Musab Al-Battat made a defensive intervention moments later. Australia sealed their win in the 90th minute, with substitute Apostolos Giannou rising high to head home an Ikonomidis cross following an Australian set-piece.

Australia vs Syria

Chris Ikonomidis found the hands of Ibrahim Alma with his long range attempt before the Syrian keeper twice denied Jamie Maclaren. In the 41st minute, Awer Mabil's curling strike arced its way inside the keeper’s right post. The lead was to last less than two minutes, however, as Moayad Ajan seared down the left flank beyond Rhyan Grant and sent in a cross that Omar Kharbin headed goalward. Mathew Ryan made the initial save, but Kharbin converted the rebound. Nine minutes after the restart, Australia were back in front. Tom Rogic’s ball from the left slid past Hussein Jwayed to land at the feet of Ikonomidis, who steered his effort over the line. Substitute Apostolos Giannou then hit the post 15 minutes from time, and five minutes later Syria were level after the referee pointed to the spot and Omar Al Somah converted. Three minutes into added time, Rogic gave Australia the win after he scored with an effort from distance. For Syria, this defeat meant they had not progressed from the group stage for the sixth consecutive AFC Asian Cup.

Palestine vs Jordan
Palestine came close to breaking the deadlock in the 17th minute when Amer Shafi produced a fingertip save to keep out Abdelatif Bahdari’s flicked attempt from a Tamer Seyam corner. Baha' Abdel-Rahman then flashed a shot inches over the bar from distance, before, in the final moments of the first half, Shafi punched clear with striker Mahmoud Wadi lurking. Six minutes after the restart, Oday Dabbagh failed to find the target with a header from Musab Al-Battat’s delivery. Moments later, Bahdari’s header from another Seyam set-piece was gathered on his line by Shafi, and Ahmad Ersan’s 68th minute shot at the other end was saved by Rami Hamadeh.

Discipline
Fair play points were used as tiebreakers if the head-to-head and overall records of teams were tied (and if a penalty shoot-out was not applicable as a tiebreaker). These were calculated based on yellow and red cards received in all group matches as follows:
yellow card = 1 point
red card as a result of two yellow cards = 3 points
direct red card = 3 points
yellow card followed by direct red card = 4 points

Only one of the above deductions was applied to a player in a single match.

References

External links
 

Group B
2019 in Australian soccer
2018–19 in Syrian football
2018–19 in Jordanian football
2018–19 in Palestinian football